Hegelochus, son of Hippostratus, was a Macedonian general, and apparently the nephew of Philip II's last wife, Cleopatra. Hegelochus survived the disgrace of his relative, Attalus, who was murdered on Alexander the Great's instructions in 336/5 BC. At the battle of the Granicus, he led a body of prodromoi ("fore-runners, scouts"). In the following year Amphoterus was appointed commander of the fleet in Hellespont, and Hegelochus was placed under his orders, with a commission to drive the Persian garrisons from the islands in the Aegean Sea. In this he was fully successful, the islanders being themselves anxious to throw off the Persian yoke; and he brought the news of his success to Alexander in 331 BC, when the king was engaged in the foundation of Alexandria. In the same year he commanded a troop of horse at the battle of Arbela; and in the confession of Philotas, in 330 BC, he is mentioned as having died in a battle. According to the statements of Philotas, Hegelochus, indignant at Alexander's assumption of divine honours and the proskynesis, had instigated Parmenion to form a plot against the king's life.

References
Who's who in the age of Alexander the Great 

Admirals of Alexander the Great
Generals of Alexander the Great
Ancient Macedonian generals
Ancient Macedonian admirals
4th-century BC Macedonians
Ancient Macedonians killed in battle
331 BC deaths
Year of birth unknown